Bharatganj Singaul is a town under Nijgadh Municipality  in Bara District in the Narayani Zone of south-middle Nepal. At the time of the 2011 Nepal Census Nepal census 2011, it had a population of 5,303 (2,516 male, 2,787 female) persons living in 1,097 individual households.

References

External links
UN map of the municipalities of Bara District

Populated places in Bara District